Jacques Favart (30 July 1920 – 27 September 1980) was a French sports official and figure skater.

He won the French Figure Skating Championships in men's singles in 1942. As a pair skater, he competed with his wife Denise Favart from 1946 to 1950. They placed 14th at the 1948 Winter Olympics.

He served as president of the International Skating Union from 1967 to 1980, and of Fédération Française des Sports de Glace from 1968 to 1969.

He was inaugurated in the World Figure Skating Hall of Fame in 1993.

Competitive highlights

Single skating

Pair skating
(with Denise Favart)

 WD = Withdrawn

References

 ISU statistics
 various news papers
 Magazin Patinage artistique

External links 
 International Skating Union – Past Presidents at www.isu.org
 

1920 births
1980 deaths
French referees and umpires
French male single skaters
French male pair skaters
Olympic figure skaters of France
Figure skaters at the 1948 Winter Olympics
Figure skaters from Paris
International Skating Union presidents